Kristian Blak (born 31 March 1947), originally from Fredericia, Denmark, lives in the Faroe Islands where he is a composer, musician, and record executive. He is the founder of the Nordic musical ensemble Yggdrasil (named after the World tree Yggdrasil). He has worked with sounds in the Faroese nature in several compositions. These include concerts in caves and other natural "concert halls" in the Faroe Islands. He has composed solo instrumental works, chamber music, choral works and symphonic music, for example the ballad Harra Pætur og Elinborg.
In 2010 Queen Margrethe of Denmark visited the Faroe Islands, and one of the events she visited was a grotto concert in Klæmintsgjógv (Gorge of Klæmint) by Kristian Blak and other musicians. The cave is 50 meter high and the sea in the cave is around 400 meter deep. There are some places inside the cave where the musicians can stand with their instruments and give a concert to the audience in the boats.

He is the chief executive officer of Tutl, which is the leading record label in the Faroe Islands.

In 2002 he received the Faroese Literature Prize for his work with music in the Faroe Islands. In 2011 he received the Heiðursgáva Landsins, which is handed at the same time as the Faroese Literature Prize, given by the Faroese government.

Musical Works 
 2001 PINIARTUT with Tellu Virkkala, Rasmus Lyberth and Ville Kangas
 1999 24 PRÉLUDES
 1998 KLÆMINT
 1997 SHALDER GEO
 1991 RAVNATING
 1990 FIRRA
 1989 ADDEQ
 1988 ANTIFONALE
 1987 FJAND with Svend Bjerg
 1984 KINGOLØG
 1983 SJÓMANSRÍMUR
 1979 SNJÓUGLAN

Albums

Solo albums 
 2005 Úr Holminum, 8 tracks, Tutl
 2005 Snjóuglan, 10 Tracks, Tutl
 1999 Klæmint Tutl
 1992 Harra Pætur og Elinborg
 1991 Ravnating, 8 tracks, Tutl

Yggdrasil 

 2004 LIVE AT RUDOLSTADT
 2002 YGGDRASIL
 1984/1995/2000 CONCERTO GROTTO & DRANGAR
 1988 BRØYTINGAR Koncept: Ole Wich
 1983/85 THE FOUR TOWERS & HEYGAR OG DREYGAR
 1982 RAVNATING
 1981 DEN YDERSTE Ø

Spælimenninir 

 2003 Malargrót
 1996 Flóð Og Fjøra
 1986 Hinvegin
 1984 Rekaviður
 1980 Burturav

Spælimenninir í Hoydølum 
Spælimenninir í Hoydølum is the name of a former musical ensemble, they took name after a place name in Tórshavn called Hoydalar, the High School is located there.
 1984 Á ferð
 1987 Umaftur
 1977 Spælimenninir í Hoydølum

Music for children 

 2003 Sóljudansir
 1997 Øll hava veingir
 1985 Syng bara við
 1983 Nósi
 1977 Nu ska' vi u å sejle við Kræklingum og øðrum.

Prizes 
2011 Heiðursgáva Landsins (Prize of Honor from the Faroese Ministry of Culture) – DKK 75 000
2002 Faroese Literature Prize  – DKK 150,000

Private life 
Kristian Blak was married to Sharon Weiss in November 1977, she is also a musician and comes from Lexington, Massachusetts. Together they have three children: Mikael, Sámal and Rebekka.

See also 

Music of the Faroe Islands

Literature
 Kirsten Brix, Erhard Jacobsen, Ole Wich (ed.): Très bien. Kristian Blak 60 år. Tórshavn: Plátufelagið Tutl, 2007 (126 s., incl. CD)

References

External links
 Kristian Blak personal site

1947 births
Living people
Danish composers
Male composers
Faroese composers
Danish emigrants to the Faroe Islands
Faroese Literature Prize recipients
People from Fredericia